"Strange Relationship" is the second solo single released by Australian singer Darren Hayes from his debut studio album, Spin (2002). The single was released in May 2002 and made it into the top 40 in Australia, Sweden, and the United Kingdom. The music video was directed by Tommy O'Haver; it features Hayes moving around a film set with a number of other people and changing scenery.

Track listings
 Australia CD1
 "Strange Relationship" (album version)
 "So Bad" (original demo recording)
 "Insatiable" (Metro Boys remix)

 Australia CD2 – The Remixes
 "Strange Relationship" (album version)
 "Strange Relationship" ('dp versus 'Darren Hayes' mix)
 "Strange Relationship" (Specificus Mad Scientist mix)
 "Strange Relationship" (Specificus Jungle Lounge mix)

 UK CD1
 "Strange Relationship" (radio edit) – 3:58
 "Sexual Healing" (Capital Radio Session) – 4:00
 "So Bad" (original demo recording) – 4:09
 "Strange Relationship" (video)

 UK CD2
 "Strange Relationship" (album version) – 5:00
 "Insatiable" (Capital Radio Session) – 5:15
 "Strange Relationship" (dp versus Darren Hayes mix) – 4:06

 UK cassette single and European CD single
 "Strange Relationship" (album version) – 5:00
 "Sexual Healing" (Capital Radio Session) – 4:00

Credits and personnel
Credits are lifted from the Spin album booklet.

Studios
 Recorded and mixed at Wallyworld Studios (Marin County, California)
 Orchestra recorded at Ocean Way Recording (Los Angeles)
 Mastered at Gateway Mastering (Portland, Maine, US)

Personnel

 Darren Hayes – writing, lead and background vocals, co-production
 Greg Bieck – writing, recordings (lead vocals)
 Walter Afanasieff – keyboards, bass, drum and rhythm programming, production, arrangement
 Vernon Black – electric guitars
 Bruce Dukov – violin
 Eve Butler – violin
 Susan Chatman – violin
 Charlie Everett – violin
 Gerry Hilera – violin
 Norm Hughes – violin
 Peter Kent – violin
 Jennifer Munday – violin
 Bob Peterson – violin
 Michele Richards – violin
 Bob Sanov – violin
 Ed Stein – violin
 John Wittenberg – violin
 John Hayhurst – viola
 Karen Elaine – viola
 Virginia Frazier – viola
 Andrew Picken – viola
 Larry Corbett – cello
 Suzie Katayama – cello, orchestral contracting
 Paula Hochhalter – cello
 Dan Smith – cello
 John Mitchell – contra-alto clarinet
 David Campbell – orchestral conducting and arrangement
 David Reitzas – orchestral engineering
 Robert Conley – programming, recording (background vocals), engineering
 Nick Thomas – engineering
 Chris Lord-Alge – mixing
 Bob Ludwig – mastering

Charts

Release history

References

2001 songs
2002 singles
Columbia Records singles
Darren Hayes songs
Song recordings produced by Walter Afanasieff
Songs written by Darren Hayes
Sony Music singles